Paekākāriki is a town in the Kapiti Coast District in the south-western North Island, New Zealand, and one of the northernmost suburbs of Wellington. The town's name comes from the Māori language and can mean "parakeet perch". Paekākāriki had a population of 1,665 at the time of the 2013 census, up 66 from the 2006 census.

Paekākāriki lies on a narrowing of the thin coastal plain between the Tasman Sea and the Akatarawa Ranges (a spur of the Tararua Ranges), and thus serves as an important transportation node. To the south, State Highway 59 climbs towards Porirua; to the north the plains extend inland from the Kapiti Coast; at Paekākāriki the highway and North Island Main Trunk railway run close together between the coast and hills. Paekākāriki is also served by the nearby Transmission Gully and Kapiti Expressway (both part of State Highway 1).

Etymology
The town's name comes from the Māori language Paekākāriki. Pae in Māori can mean 'perch' and kākāriki 'parakeet', so pae kākāriki can mean 'parakeet perch'. Though usually written in English without macrons, the New Zealand Geographic Board changed the official name to Paekākāriki on 21 June 2019.

The name was also spelled Paikakariki prior to 1905, but is recorded as Paekakariki as far back as 1850.

History

Prior to European settlement, the area was contested by Māori groups including Rangitāne and Muaūpoko. During the 1820s the great war leader Te Rauparaha defeated and expelled the earlier inhabitants and claimed the region for Ngāti Toa and their allies. Ngāti Haumia, a hapū of Ngāti Toa, built their pa by the mouth of the Wainui steam at the northern end of Paekākāriki. Te Rauparaha, whose pa was on nearby Kapiti Island, died in 1849, the same year that a road connecting Paekākāriki with Porirua was completed. In 1850 the New Zealand Government resettled Wainui's inhabitants and merged their pa with the new settlement of Paekākāriki.

Paekākāriki's history has been intimately linked with the railway, and there is a museum at the Paekākāriki railway station commemorating this heritage. In 1886 the Wellington and Manawatu Railway Company's line from Wellington to Longburn was completed, and Paekākāriki became an important stop on the journey. In 1908, the line was incorporated into the national network of the New Zealand Railways Department and became part of the North Island Main Trunk linking Wellington and Auckland, the North Island's most important line. In 1917, NZR withdrew dining cars from its passenger trains due to World War I economic difficulties and Paekākāriki became a main refreshment stop on the trip north; originally a temporary measure, the dining cars did not return for decades and Paekākāriki's status remained until the 1960s.

From 1940 the line south to Wellington through the new Tawa Flat deviation was electrified and at Paekakariki engines were changed, with a steam engine depot at Paekakariki. Electrified commuter services were also extended to Paekakariki. The locomotive depot gradually declined in importance due to changing motive power, and nowadays only FP/FT "Matangi" class electric multiple units are stabled here. The old steam locomotive depot is now the location of "The Engine Shed", the base of Steam Incorporated, one of New Zealand's premier railway preservation societies. The Paekakariki Station Precinct Trust has been established to manage the station area, including the museum and Steam Incorporated's depot, and firmly establish it as a historical and tourist attraction.

During the Second World War Paekākāriki served as a major base for US Marines fighting in the Pacific Campaign. There were three main camps, all situated in or adjacent to present-day Queen Elizabeth Park. At the height of the occupation there were over 20,000 Americans stationed in the region, significantly outnumbering locals. The camps were used for training purposes, as well as rest and recreation for those returning from the Pacific combat zone. Paekākāriki's steep surrounding hills proved suitable terrain for marching and mortar practice, whilst its beaches were used to stage amphibian invasions. They were the scene of an unfortunate tragedy in June 1943 when a landing craft was swamped by a wave during a nighttime training exercise. Nine men drowned in the heavy surf according to official figures; local rumour put the toll higher. The incident was not reported at the time due to wartime censorship provisions.

While the American base in Paekākāriki was only in existence for a few years it had an important and lingering impact on the region. Several local place names remain as reminders of this wartime presence. Tarawa Street, for example, commemorates one of the bloodiest battles of the Pacific War which locally based marines fought in directly after the camps were abandoned in October 1943.

Demographics 

Paekākāriki had a population of 1,746 at the 2018 New Zealand census, an increase of 78 people (4.7%) since the 2013 census, and an increase of 144 people (9.0%) since the 2006 census. There were 711 households. There were 831 males and 915 females, giving a sex ratio of 0.91 males per female. The median age was 44.9 years (compared with 37.4 years nationally), with 327 people (18.7%) aged under 15 years, 222 (12.7%) aged 15 to 29, 930 (53.3%) aged 30 to 64, and 267 (15.3%) aged 65 or older.

Ethnicities were 89.3% European/Pākehā, 17.4% Māori, 3.1% Pacific peoples, 2.7% Asian, and 3.6% other ethnicities (totals add to more than 100% since people could identify with multiple ethnicities).

The proportion of people born overseas was 21.5%, compared with 27.1% nationally.

Although some people objected to giving their religion, 68.9% had no religion, 19.9% were Christian, 0.2% were Hindu, 0.2% were Muslim, 0.9% were Buddhist and 3.4% had other religions.

Of those at least 15 years old, 573 (40.4%) people had a bachelor or higher degree, and 126 (8.9%) people had no formal qualifications. The median income was $35,800, compared with $31,800 nationally. The employment status of those at least 15 was that 702 (49.5%) people were employed full-time, 267 (18.8%) were part-time, and 48 (3.4%) were unemployed.

Local government

Paekākāriki is administered by the Kapiti Coast District Council and elects the Paekākāriki Community Board, one of the Council's four community boards.

Education

In popular culture

 The town was featured in the 1999 song "Paekakariki Beach", by the British rock group New Model Army. and in the 1948 song "Paekakariki, the land of the Tiki" by Ken Avery. 
 The town also appeared in an animated documentary by the Simmonds Brothers, entitled: "Paekakariki: Center of the Universe".
 The American writer Leon Uris was stationed as a marine in Paekākāriki during World War II. He drew on his experiences there when writing his first novel Battle Cry.
 An album entitled "Paekakariki Moon" by Warwick Murray, featuring songs written and sounds recorded in the town, was released in 2017.

Notes

References

External links
 Paekakariki Surf Lifeguards
 Paekakariki in the land of the Tiki (cover of music to 1948 song, with photo of composer Ken Avery)

Populated places in the Wellington Region
Kapiti Coast District